Gretna carmen, commonly known as the violet crepuscular skipper, is a species of butterfly in the family Hesperiidae. It is found in Ivory Coast, Cameroon, the Central African Republic, the Democratic Republic of the Congo, Uganda, Kenya, Tanzania and Zambia.

The larvae feed on Raphia fanoidra, Phoenix, Borassus and Cocus species.

Subspecies
Gretna carmen carmen (Ivory Coast, Cameroon, Central African Republic, Democratic Republic of the Congo, Uganda, western Kenya, western Tanzania)
Gretna carmen capra Evans, 1937 (coast of Kenya, Tanzania: coast to the eastern shores of Lake Tanganyika, Zambia)

References

Butterflies described in 1937
Hesperiinae